"What You're Made Of" is the first single from British singer Lucie Silvas' debut album, Breathe In (2004). Released on 4 October 2004, the song debuted and peaked at number seven on the UK Singles Chart and reached the top 30 in Austria, Ireland, the Netherlands, and Sweden.

Silvas subsequently recorded two different versions of the song: one with French singer Grégory Lemarchal and another with Spanish singer Antonio Orozco. The French version—titled "Même si (What You're Made Of)"—peaked at number two in France and charted strongly in Wallonia and Switzerland. In 2006, Silvas recorded a third version with the Dutch Metropole Orchestra that became a minor hit in the Netherlands.

Track listings

Credits and personnel
Credits are lifted from the UK CD1 liner notes.

Studios
 Recorded at Studio 360
 Strings recorded at Abbey Road Studios (London, England)
 Mixed at Quad Studios (New York City)

Personnel

 Lucie Silvas – writing, vocals, piano
 Peter Gordeno – writing, keyboards
 Mike Peden – writing, percussion, production
 Graham Kearns – guitars
 Paul Turner – bass
 Charlie Russell – drums, drum programming
 Martin Hayles – recording

 Dan Gautreau – recording assistant
 Gary Thomas – recording (strings)
 Michael H. Brauer – mixing
 Keith Gary – mixing assistant, Pro Tools engineering
 Nick Ingman – string arrangement, conductor
 Gavyn Wright – concertmaster
 Isobel Griffiths – orchestra contractor

Charts

Original version

Weekly charts

Year-end charts

Duet with Grégory Lemarchal

Weekly charts

Year-end charts

Metropole Orchestra version

References

2004 songs
2004 singles
2005 singles
2006 singles
Grégory Lemarchal songs
Lucie Silvas songs
Macaronic songs
Male–female vocal duets
Mercury Records singles
Songs written by Mike Peden
Songs written by Lucie Silvas
Songs written by Peter Gordeno (musician)